Little Angels' School is a private school system based in Hattiban, Lalitpur District of Nepal, Kathmandu. It offers schooling, A-Levels and +2 facilities, and education up to the SEE.

Description and history
Little Angels' School (LAS) has a primary wing near its buildings. The main Hattiban campus offers education up to high school but also includes post-secondary levels. In 2066 BS, LAS began offering the internationally recognized General Certificate of Education classes - Cambridge A-Level. It is promoted as an English medium school. The school teaches more than 4,600 students. Including A-Level students, Little Angels College, and Little Angels College of Management, total enrollment is about 6,400 students, and just above 700 teachers/lecturers are employed.

Little Angels School was started in 1981, Both the founder principals were in the field of education long before LAS was born—one in administration, the other in teaching. The founders - Bidhya Limbu and Umesh Shrestha - now act as founder directors while the responsibilities of a principal are handled by Mukunda Raj Sharma. Shrestha holds an M.A. in School Management.

The school uses about 150 buses to transport almost 8,000 students each school day.
The school premises includes four basketball courts, a football ground, two lawn tennis courts, two volleyball courts, and a spacious playground in each block. The school has two swimming pools for the students{.

Little Angels' School is a member of the Private and Boarding Schools Organization of Nepal.

Section divisions
In 2016, Little Angels' School adopted a new policy for section division. Previously, the school had section names of an alphabet (A, B, C, and so on) followed by a number (1,2; and 3 for hostel students up to Grade 8). An example would be 9 A2, 9 being the grade, and A2 the section name. The 'A' alphabet denotes the elite students of the school, and other sections follow suit as B1/B2, C1/C2, and so on.

From 2016 henceforth, the 10th-grade students are categorized randomly into sections instead of on a merit basis. The section numbers are up to 4 instead of 2 (e.g. 10 A4). Similarly, in lower classes, the sections have been expanding

School leaving certificate record
The Little Angels school academic record with the percentage of students successfully obtaining the School Leaving Certificate, up to the Bikram Samwat calendar year 2064:

Little Angels' College
The Little Angels' College (LAC) was founded in 1997 under the Nepal Educational Foundation. Total enrollment is about 480 students. There were ten sections (4 physical groups and 6 biological groups) in the year 2016/17. In 2009, LAC introduced GCE A Level course.

Little Angels' College of Management
The Little Angels' College of Management (LACM) was founded in 1999. LACM offers BBA, BBIS and BHM degrees in affiliation with Kathmandu University.

References

External links
 Little Angels' Group
 Little Angels' School
Little Angels' College
Little Angels' College of Management

Schools in Nepal
Lalitpur District, Nepal
Educational institutions established in 1981
1981 establishments in Nepal